The European Boxing Federation (EBF) is a boxing governing body and sanctioning organisation created in 2005. Although the organisation is called European it lists its title holders as world champions.

The organisation is based mainly in the United Kingdom and is separate for the British Boxing Board of Control which governs and sanctions mainstream boxing in the UK. The EBF specialises in "white-collar" boxing, separate from mainstream boxing recorded on sites such as Boxrec. It has about 700 registered boxers.

History
The maiden Heavyweight EBF title fight was made on 14 September 2008 along with Mark Potter's Title defence against Eric "Butterbean" Esch at the Syndicate nightclub in Blackpool, England. American former world heavyweight champion, Tim Witherspoon made a guest appearance.
Gavin 'One Armed Bandit' Nicholls cruised through the rankings with two impressive performances on home turf in 2012. The rest of the middleweight division didn't want no aggro so he was crowned champion by Default.

Current EBF Champions

source -http://www.ebfboxing.org/rankings.php

References

External links 
 

Professional boxing organizations